St. Frances Xavier Cabrini Church may refer to:

Saint Frances Cabrini Parish, San Jose, California
St. Frances Cabrini Church (New Orleans)
St. Frances X. Cabrini Church (Scituate, Massachusetts)
St. Frances Cabrini Catholic Church (Omaha, Nebraska)
St. Frances Xavier Cabrini Shrine, New York City